Beit Jinn, also known as Bayt Jin, Beit Jann or Beyt Jene, is a town in southern Syria, administratively part of the Rif Dimashq Governorate, located southwest of Damascus on the foothills of Mount Hermon. According to the Syria Central Bureau of Statistics, Beit Jinn had a population of 2,846 in the 2004 census. Its inhabitants are predominantly Sunni Muslims.

The town is the administrative center of the Beit Jinn Subdistrict, which consists of nine towns, with a combined population of 15,668. The subdistrict has a mixed Sunni and Druze population and Beit Jinn contains a Druze religious shrine. Nearby localities include Arnah to the north, Darbal to the northeast, Mazraat Beit Jinn to the east, Harfa to the southeast, and Hader to the southwest. The Nahr al-Awaj river (ancient Pharpar) passes near the town.

History
Beit Jinn was visited by Andalusian geographer Ibn Jubayr in the late 12th century, during Ayyubid rule. He noted that it was "a village between Darayyah and Baniyas lying among the hills."

In 1838, during Ottoman rule, Eli Smith noted Beit Jinn's population as being predominantly Sunni Muslim.

In December 2017, according to the Syrian Observatory for Human Rights, the village was a source of fighting between the Syrian Arab Armed Forces and the al-Qaeda-affiliated Levant Liberation Committee. Following the Beit Jinn offensive of late 2017, the Syrian government took control of the area. The local rebels surrendered and were allowed to leave.

References

Bibliography

 

Populated places in Qatana District
Towns in Syria